The Kamieniec Ząbkowicki Palace is a 19th-century monumental palace in the form of a medieval castle, located in the village of Kamieniec Ząbkowicki, Lower Silesia, in southwestern Poland. It was designed by Karl Friedrich Schinkel in the Neo-Gothic architectural style and completed in 1872 under the German Empire.

History
The first owner of the Kamieniec Ząbkowicki Palace (then known as Schloss Kamenz) was Princess Marianne of the Netherlands, who in 1838, commissioned the construction of the palace to Karl Friedrich Schinkel. In 1848, construction works were halted due to Princess Marianne's divorce with Prince Albert of Prussia, only to be renewed in 1853. In 1858, the terrace gardens were designed by Peter Joseph Lenné, the General Director of Prussian Parks. In 1873, and with the marriage of Albrecht's son, Princess Marianne granted Albert property rights. During World War II, the Germans used the palace complex as a transit station for ransacked art works. After 1945, the interior of the palace was either looted or devastated by Red Army soldiers, with part of the marble salvaged to construct the Congress Hall at the Palace of Culture and Science in Warsaw.

Presently, successive renovation works since 2013, financed by the Ministry of Culture and National Heritage of Poland have secured the property, opening the site to tourists.

Architecture
The Neo-Gothic palace is located on a hill, towering above the town of Kamieniec to the east. The rectangular complex 75.3 meters in length by 48.3 meters in width. The four corner towers are 33.6 meters in height. The cloistered courtyard is approximately 19.5 by 18.2 meters. The palace itself is enclosed by a defensive wall with circular side bastions and turrets, giving it a medieval appearance. The large parkland features a Neoclassical mausoleum of the Hohenzollern family.

Gallery

References

Palaces in Poland
Gothic Revival architecture in Poland
Karl Friedrich Schinkel buildings
Ząbkowice Śląskie County